Landmannahellir is a small cave at the foot of the Hellisfjall mountain middle of Suðurland (South Iceland) in the influence area of the volcano Hekla.

It used to be a shelter for farmers with their sheep. Today it serves tourism. A few huts were built near the cave.

Next to Landmannahellir 
 Löðmundur mountain in the north
 Löðmundarvatn lake in the east
 Landmannaleið trail

References 

Caves of Iceland